Dobretići is a village and municipality located in Central Bosnia Canton of the Federation of Bosnia and Herzegovina, an entity of Bosnia and Herzegovina. It is one of the youngest and smallest municipalities in Bosnia and Herzegovina hence being one of the poorest municipalities as well. Before the Bosnian War municipality of Dobretići was part of municipality Skender Vakuf (today Kneževo).

Name
The municipality of Dobretići was in the prior censuses known as Dobratići. After the Bosnian War, the name of the village became Dobretići, to align it with the name of medieval Bosnian aristocrat Stjepan Dobreta. The locals of the municipality like to call the area around the village Pougarje, after the local river, the Ugar.

Geography
It is located on the mountain of Ranča in the Central Bosnia Canton of the Federation of Bosnia and Herzegovina. The municipality is 20 kilometers northeast from the town of Jajce.

Administrative divisions
Today's municipality is made of 18 settlements: Brnjići, Bunar, Davidovići, Dobretići, Donji Orašac, Gornji Orašac, Kričići-Jejići, Melina, Mijatovići, Milaševci, Pavlovići, Prisika, Slipčevići, Vitovlje Malo, Vukovići, Zapeće, Zasavica i Zubovići.

Demographics

Population

Ethnic composition

References

External links

Populated places in Dobretići
Municipalities of the Central Bosnia Canton